Enrique Peña may refer to:
Enrique Peña Nieto (born 1966), 57th President of Mexico
Enrique Peña Sánchez (1880–1922), Cuban bandleader and cornettist
Enrique Peña Zauner (born 2000), Venezuelan-German footballer
Enrique Peña (athlete) (born 1942), Colombian racewalker
Álvaro Enrique Peña (born 1989), Uruguayan footballer
José Enrique Peña (born 1963), Uruguayan footballer
José Enrique de la Peña (1807–1840), colonel in the Mexican Army